Manimala Singhal (born 11 April 1965) is a former Test and One Day International cricketer who represented India. She is a right hand batsman and wicket-keeper. She has played six Tests and six ODIs.

References

Living people
1965 births
People from Delhi
India women One Day International cricketers
India women Test cricketers
Indian women cricketers
Railways women cricketers
Wicket-keepers